Gilberto Valbuena Sánchez (4 February 1929 – 22 December 2021) was a Mexican Roman Catholic prelate. Valbuena Sánchez was born in Chietla, Puebla on 4 February 1929. He was bishop of Colima from 1989 to 2005.

References

1929 births
2021 deaths
20th-century Roman Catholic bishops in Mexico
21st-century Roman Catholic bishops in Mexico
Bishops appointed by Pope Paul VI
People from Jalisco
People from Puebla